Die Scheinheiligen, or The Hypocrites, is a German low-budget comedy film, written and directed by Thomas Kronthaler and based on a true incident in his hometown of Irschenberg. It became popular particularly in Bavarian cinemas.

Plot 
The local government of Irschenberg are planning the construction of a motorway exit with a fast-food restaurant, for which they need the property of Magdalena Trenner, a rich old woman who is unpopular in the village until she takes in a traveling carpenter, Johannes, and later an asylum seeker named Theophile.

With their help she regains popularity among the villagers and prevents the mayor's numerous plots to get his hands on her land from succeeding. When she dies the mayor thinks he has won, but Johannes tricks them into believing she left a will leaving her entire property to the local scouts. A fight starts at the end of which the mayor has to abandon his plans.

Cast 
 Maria Singer as Magdalena Trenner
 Johannes Demmel as Johannes
 Michael Emina as Theophile
 Andreas Lechner as the priest
 Werner Rom as the mayor
 Wolfgang Fischer as policeman Bene

References

External links 
 

2001 comedy films
2001 films
2000s German-language films
Films set in Bavaria
German comedy films
2000s German films